Melanie Oudin was the defending champion, but lost in the first round to Ajla Tomljanović.

Daniela Hantuchová won the title, defeating Donna Vekić 7–6(7–5), 6–4 in the final.

Seeds
The top eight seeds receive a bye into the second round.

Draw

Finals

Top half

Section 1

Section 2

Bottom half

Section 3

Section 4

Qualifying

Seeds

Qualifiers

Qualifying draw

First qualifier

Second qualifier

Third qualifier

Fourth qualifier

Fifth qualifier

Sixth qualifier

Seventh qualifier

Eighth qualifier

References
 Main Draw
 Qualifying Draw

Aegon Classicandnbsp;- Singles
Singles